Benthosema fibulatum is a species of fish in the family Myctophidae. It is a meso- to bathypelagic species found in the Indian and Pacific Oceans. It grows to  total length.

References 

Myctophidae
Fish of the Indian Ocean
Fish of the Pacific Ocean
Fish described in 1897
Taxa named by Frank Cramer
Taxa named by Charles Henry Gilbert